The 2003–04 ULEB Cup Semi finals basketball statistics are here. The 2003–04 ULEB Cup was the second season of Europe's secondary level professional club basketball tournament, the ULEB Cup, which is organised by Euroleague Basketball.

Semifinal 1

Semifinal 2

See also
2002–03 in Spanish basketball

References

Semi finals
2003–04 in Serbian basketball
2003–04 in Israeli basketball
2003–04 in Spanish basketball